Luka Belić may refer to:

 Luka Belić (tennis) (born 1988), former tennis player from Croatia
 Luka Belić (footballer) (born 1996), Serbian football midfielder